Joanna Hughes (born 22 December 1977) is an Australian gymnast. She competed at the 1996 Summer Olympics, where she finished 34th in the individual all around.

References

External links
 

1977 births
Living people
Australian female artistic gymnasts
Olympic gymnasts of Australia
Gymnasts at the 1996 Summer Olympics
Sportspeople from Melbourne
Commonwealth Games medallists in gymnastics
Commonwealth Games bronze medallists for Australia
Gymnasts at the 1994 Commonwealth Games
20th-century Australian women
Medallists at the 1994 Commonwealth Games